Arlington is a historic home located at Westover, Somerset County, Maryland, and is located at the end of James Ring Road on Maryland Route 361.  It is a prominent mid-18th-century Flemish bond brick dwelling.  It was built around 1750 by Ephraim Wilson, the two-story, center hall, single-pile house is highlighted by glazed checkerboard brick patterns on each wall.  It features a Federal period porch enriched with a cornice of paired modillion blocks and original engaged Tuscan columns against the back wall.

It was listed on the National Register of Historic Places in 1992.

References

External links
, including photo from 1983, at Maryland Historical Trust

Houses in Somerset County, Maryland
Houses on the National Register of Historic Places in Maryland
Houses completed in 1750
Federal architecture in Maryland
Georgian architecture in Maryland
National Register of Historic Places in Somerset County, Maryland